The second season of Rock of Love with Bret Michaels was confirmed by VH1 in October 2007. On December 8, 2007, VH1 started playing advertisements for Rock of Love 2 with Bret Michaels. The second season premiered on January 13, 2008.

Production and legal problems
In April 2008 a breach-of-contract lawsuit was filed against both Michaels and the show's producers by the owner of the mansion, Ray Sahranavard. He claims that there was about $380,000 worth of damages done to the mansion, and that the producers failed to get insurance that they had previously promised to purchase for the house. Sahranavard stated that there were multiple holes in the walls and ceilings, the doors had been removed, and that almost the entire interior of the house had been repainted. He also claimed that most of the landscaping was either dead or dying.

Contestants

 Courtney was eliminated in the first episode but due to her not attending the elimination ceremony, she was asked to leave the next morning.
Contestant Bret planned to eliminate

Elimination order

Contestants in bold indicates that they received V.I.P. Access/Passes.

 The contestant won the competition.
 The contestant went on a solo date with Bret.
 The contestant went on a group date with Bret.
 The contestant was eliminated.
 The contestant won a date with Bret, but was eliminated.
 The contestant won a date with Bret, but voluntarily withdrew from the competition.
 The contestant was called down first, but was eliminated before the elimination ceremony began.
 The contestant did not attend the elimination ceremony and was eliminated the next morning.
 The contestant quit the competition.
 The contestant did not receive a pass, but was allowed to stay due to another contestant quitting the competition.
 The contestant won a date with Bret and did not receive a pass, but was allowed to stay due to another contestant quitting the competition.
 In Episode 1, Bret had the final pass for Jackye, although she came down and decided to quit the competition due to her anxiety of being there. Therefore, Bret decided to give the final pass to Ambre, and allow her to stay.
 In Episode 1, Courtney got drunk and passed out on her bed. She slept throughout the elimination ceremony. After the elimination ceremony was over, Bret said that Courtney was allowed to stay until the next morning where she would be told that her tour ends here.
 In Episode 4, Aubry chose to give up her spot before the last pass was given, only for Bret to reveal it after she left that she was to be eliminated anyway
 In Episode 5, Bret did not eliminate anyone and stated he was "saving the best for last" referring to Daisy.
 In Episode 11, Bret called down Destiney and eliminated her, no passes were handed out and the remaining contestants' names are listed in alphabetical order.
 Episode 12 was a recap episode.

Episodes

Back to the Rocking Horse
First aired January 13, 2008

V.I.P.'s: Daisy, Destiney, Erin, Megan
Bottom 6: Ambre, Ashley, Courtney, Erin, Jackye, Missi
Withdrew: Jackye
Eliminated: Ashley, Erin, Missi
Allowed to Stay: Ambre, Courtney
Reasons for Elimination:
Jackye: Quit because she stated that she has anxiety and could not handle being there*
Ashley: Didn't stand out to Bret
Missi: Didn't stand out to Bret
Erin: Bret felt like she was too young and innocent
Courtney: Because she missed the elimination ceremony due to being too intoxicated
Note: Ambre was originally planned to be eliminated. But because Jackye quit, Ambre was allowed to stay and ultimately won the competition.

Peep Show
First aired January 20, 2008

Challenge Winners: Ambre, Daisy, Peyton
Bottom Four: Angelique, Korie, Niki, Sara
Eliminated: Korie, Niki, Sara
Reasons for Eliminations:
Korie: She still had not made an impression on Bret
Niki: Bret felt that she did not have the confidence to be with him
Sara: Sara allegedly said that she was on the show on a dare. She denied it, but Bret didn't believe her.

Stroller Derby
First aired January 27, 2008

Challenge Winners: Aubry, Angelique, Kristy Joe, Inna
Bottom Three: Angelique, Kristy Joe, Roxy
Eliminated: Angelique, Roxy
Reasons for Elimination:
Roxy: Bret felt she was not making an effort to get to know him after not using her VIP Pass
Angelique: Bret felt she was too promiscuous for him

A Ride on the Wild Side
First aired February 10, 2008

Challenge Winners: Ambre, Aubry, Daisy, Inna, Megan
Bottom Two: Aubry, Kristy Joe
Quit: Aubry
Reason for Withdrawal:
Aubry: Quit because she felt like Kristy Joe deserved to stay because she liked Bret so much and she felt like she was her friend Kristy Joe a gift by quitting, however Bret revealed that she was going to be eliminated anyway because Bret felt that she was incredibly jealous, and this made him nervous since they had only known each other for a few days.

Mud Bowl II
First aired February 17, 2008

Fallen Angels: Daisy, Destiney, Inna, Kristy Joe
Sweethearts: Catherine, Peyton, Ambre, Jessica
Challenge Winners: Fallen Angels
MVP: Daisy
Bottom Two: Daisy*, Peyton
Eliminated: No one
Episode Notes:
Megan was not picked by the team captains to compete in the Mud Bowl II challenge since they needed an even number of players.
Bret stated he did not want to eliminate anyone without giving them a chance, so he eliminated no one this episode.
Bret stated that he was "saving the best for last" referring to Daisy.

Once a Cowgirl
First aired February 24, 2008

Challenge Winners: Ambre, Destiney, Kristy Joe, Jessica
Bottom Three: Catherine, Inna, Peyton
Eliminated: Catherine, Peyton
Reasons for Eliminations:
Catherine: Bret did not feel that he and Catherine were connecting.
Peyton: Bret felt she was more of a friend than a love interest.

Red, White and a Little...
First aired March 2, 2008

Challenge Winners: Jessica, Megan
Bottom Two: Inna, Kristy Joe
Eliminated: Inna
Reasons for Elimination
Inna: Bret felt that Inna was no longer a front runner, and that she was now disappearing in the crowd.

Video Vixens
First aired March 16, 2008

Challenge Winners: Ambre, Kristy Joe, Megan
Bottom Two: Kristy Joe, Megan
Withdrew: Kristy Joe
Reasons for Withdrawal:
Kristy Joe: She felt that she needed to deal with things at home before she entered a serious relationship, and that she was under too much stress. Bret did not reveal to the others that Kristy Joe would have received the last pass and Megan would have been eliminated. After saying goodbye to Kristy Joe, Bret dropped the pass by the door to show the viewers that the last pass was for Kristy Joe.

 Megan won a date with Bret, but did not receive a pass at elimination. However, Kristy Joe decided that she needed to go home and take care of some things. Because she quit, Megan was safe and nobody was eliminated.

Going to Ex-tremes
First aired March 23, 2008

Bottom Two: Jessica, Megan
Eliminated: Megan
Reasons for Elimination:
Megan: When the girls' ex-boyfriends came to the house, Megan cried and yelled at her ex-boyfriend when he revealed he was only there to promote his bar, which made her upset and she had never cried about anything when she was in the house except for her ex-boyfriend which when Bret found out he thought she still was in love with her boyfriend and decided to end her tour.

Bitter Suite
First aired March 30, 2008

Bottom 2: Destiney, Jessica
Eliminated: Jessica
Reasons for Elimination:
Jessica: Bret felt that she was not 100% ready for his lifestyle

Rockin' the 'Rents
First aired April 6, 2008

Eliminated: Destiney
Reasons for Elimination:
Destiney: When Daisy and Ambre revealed that they had fallen in love with Bret, Bret asked Destiney if she was in love, when she said she was not sure, Bret ended her tour.
NOTE: On the show Destiney's dad Tommy revealed that he had liver cancer and only had a few months left to live. After hearing Tommy compliment Bret on his fantastic bikes, Bret took Destiney's family on a Harley motorcycle ride because he knew Tommy would enjoy it very much. Shortly after the show wrapped he died. The episode was dedicated in his memory.

The Clip Show
First aired April 8, 2008

Bret's Rock of Love
First aired April 13, 2008

Dates: Bret takes each girl on an individual date.
Ambre's Date: they get a romantic massage.
Daisy's Date: they go on a boat and Daisy gets really sea sick. Bret has a romantic evening with Daisy.
Final Two: Ambre and Daisy
Bret's Rock of Love: Ambre
Eliminated: Daisy
Reasons for Elimination:
Daisy: Bret felt that there were too many secrets involving Daisy and her past with ex-boyfriend Charles, and he felt that she may have needed him more than she wanted him.

Reunion
First aired April 20, 2008

The girls come back for the reunion but only a select few get to be onstage to talk with Bret. Aubry and Kristy Joe talk about their relationship while Daisy and Heather have a showdown.

Additional cast
Big John - All Episodes
Lacey Conner - Cameo, January 27, 2008
LA Derby Dolls - Cameo, January 27, 2008
Cindy "Rodeo" Steedle - Cameo, February 24, 2008
Dean Karr - Cameo, March 16, 2008
Heather Chadwell - Cameo, March 23, 2008 and March 30, 2008

Ratings
The season finale ranked third in the week for cable shows, behind SpongeBob SquarePants and The Memory Keeper's Daughter.

After the show
Ambre made a cameo appearance on the third season of Rock of Love.
Daisy had her own dating show entitled Daisy of Love 
Destiney and Megan appeared on the first season of I Love Money where they placed 13th and 3rd respectively.
Angelique, Courtney, Destiney, Jessica, Kristy Joe, Inna and Megan appeared on the second season of Charm School where they placed 12th, 13th, 2nd, 5th, 6th, 9th, and 10th respectively. 
Prior to the show, Megan won the third season of Beauty and the Geek. She also had her own dating show called Megan Wants a Millionaire, but was canceled on August 23, 2009, due to a controversy involving castmember Ryan Jenkins.
Angelique appeared on the second season of I Love Money where she placed 6th. She also appeared on the fourteenth series of Celebrity Big Brother in 2014, where she placed 11th.
Erin appeared on the second season of NBC The Voice, where she was on "Team Cee Lo". She was eliminated on April 11, 2012.

References

External links
 
 

2008 American television seasons